Akeil Barrett (born 7 July 1992) is a Jamaican footballer.

Career

College and Youth
Barrett began his college soccer career at the University of Akron in 2011, before transferring to the University of Tulsa in 2012. He started in 46 of 54 games compiling 20 goals and 14 assists for 54 career points in his career at Tulsa. He helped lead the team to two conference championships.

While at college, Barrett played with NPSL club Tulsa Athletics during their 2014 season, where he scored 4 goals in 6 appearances.

Professional
On 15 January 2015, Barrett was selected 25th overall in the 2015 MLS SuperDraft by Orlando City SC. He signed with Orlando, but was waived soon after without making an appearance for the club.

Barrett signed with NASL side Jacksonville Armada on 2 April 2015.

In March 2016, Barrett moved to Swedish side Piteå IF. He left the club on 1 August 2016.

After his release from Pitea, Barrett signed with USL Championship side Swope Park Rangers on 15 August 2016.

On 11 January 2019, Barrett joined USL side Tulsa Roughnecks.

References

External links
 

1992 births
Living people
Jamaican footballers
Jamaican expatriate footballers
Akron Zips men's soccer players
Tulsa Golden Hurricane men's soccer players
Orlando City SC players
Jacksonville Armada FC players
Sporting Kansas City II players
Association football forwards
Expatriate soccer players in the United States
Orlando City SC draft picks
Ocean City Nor'easters players
North American Soccer League players
USL League Two players
National Premier Soccer League players
USL Championship players
Sportspeople from Kingston, Jamaica
Tulsa Athletic players
FC Tulsa players